German Korean or Korean German may refer to:

 Germans in Korea
 Koreans in Germany
 Eurasian (mixed ancestry) people of German and Korean descent
 Germany–North Korea relations
 Germany–South Korea relations